Marianne Grunberg-Manago (January 6, 1921 – January 3, 2013) was a Soviet-born French biochemist. Her work helped make possible key discoveries about the nature of the genetic code. Grunberg-Manago was the first woman to lead the International Union of Biochemistry and the 400-year-old French Academy of Sciences.

Early life
Grunberg-Manago was born into a family of artists who adhered to the teachings of the Swiss educational reformer Johann Pestalozzi. When she was 9 months old, Grunberg-Manago's parents emigrated from the Soviet Union to France.

Education and Research
Grunberg-Manago studied biochemistry and, in 1955, while working in the lab of Spanish-America biochemist Severo Ochoa, she discovered the first nucleic-acid-synthesizing enzyme.  Initially, everyone thought the new enzyme was an RNA polymerase used by E. coli cells to make long chains of RNA from separate nucleotides. But although the new enzyme could link a few nucleotides together, the reaction was highly reversible and it later became clear that the enzyme, polynucleotide phosphorylase, usually catalyzes the breakdown of RNA, not its synthesis.

Nonetheless, the enzyme was extraordinarily useful and important. Almost immediately, Marshall Nirenberg and J. Heinrich Matthaei put it to use to form the first three-nucleotide RNA codons, which coded for the amino acid phenylalanine. This first step in cracking the genetic code entirely depended on the availability of Grunberg-Manago’s enzyme. 

In 1959, Ochoa and Arthur Kornberg won the 1959 Nobel Prize in Physiology or Medicine "for the synthesis of the nucleic acids RNA and DNA." She was elected a Foreign Honorary Member of the American Academy of Arts and Sciences in 1978, a Foreign Associate Member of the National Academy of Sciences in 1982, and an International member of the American Philosophical Society in 1992.

Grunberg-Manago was the first woman to direct the International Union of Biochemistry, and she was also the first woman to preside the French Academy of Sciences from 1995 to 1996.

Later life and death

Late in her career, Grunberg-Manago was named emeritus director of research at CNRS, France’s National Center for Scientific Research.

Grunberg-Manago died in January, 2013, three days before her 92nd birthday.

Awards and nominations
Member of the EMBO (1964)
Charles-Léopold-Mayer Prize from the French Academy of Sciences (1966)
Foreign member of the American Society of Biological Chemists (1972)
Member of the Federation of American Societies for Experimental Biology)
Member of the French Society for biochemistry and molecular biology
Foreign member of the Franklin Society (1995)
Member of the Spanish Society for molecular biology
Member of the Greek Society for molecular biology
Member of the Executive Board of the ICSU 
Foreign member of the New York Academy of Sciences (1977)
Foreign member of the American Academy of Arts and Sciences (1978)
Foreign member of the National Academy of Sciences in the United States (1982)
Honorary foreign member of the USSR Academy of Sciences (1988)
Member of Academia Europaea (1988)
Honorary foreign member of the Russian Academy of sciences (1991)
Foreign member of the Ukrainian Academy of Sciences (1991)
Grand Officer of the National Order of the Legion of Honor(2008)

References

1921 births
2013 deaths
French biochemists
Officers of the French Academy of Sciences
Fellows of the American Academy of Arts and Sciences
Grand Officiers of the Légion d'honneur
Foreign associates of the National Academy of Sciences
Foreign Members of the USSR Academy of Sciences
Foreign Members of the Russian Academy of Sciences
French women scientists
Women biochemists
20th-century American women scientists
20th-century American scientists
20th-century French women
Soviet emigrants to France
21st-century American women
Members of the American Philosophical Society
Presidents of the International Union of Biochemistry and Molecular Biology